Aktuell Rapport is a pornographic magazine published in Sweden, and also sold in a Norwegian edition. Published by Tre-mag Sweden AB of Stockholm, and printed in Austria, it also contains a significant amount of non-pornographic features.

History
Aktuell Rapport was first published as Rapport 76 in Norway in 1976 by Leif Hagen, and prominently featured a mail-order catalogue for his company L. Hagen Import. From initially being a monthly publication, it progressed to weekly publication during the 1980s, before assuming the current bi-weekly frequency.

The current editor is Lau Larsen. The magazine was edited from 2000 to 2003 by Stein-Erik Mattsson.

Aktuell Rapport had a circulation of around 25,000 copies in Norway in 2007.

References

External links
Norwegian Official Website

1976 establishments in Sweden
Biweekly magazines published in Sweden
Magazines established in 1976
Monthly magazines published in Norway
Monthly magazines published in Sweden
Norwegian pornography
Swedish pornography
Pornographic magazines
Weekly magazines published in Sweden